The 1925 Ohio Bobcats football team was an American football team that represented Ohio University in the Ohio Athletic Conference during the 1925 college football season. In their second season under head coach Don Peden, the Bobcats compiled a 6–2 record and outscored opponents by a total of 95 to 40. Coach Peden was 26 years old during the 1925 season and remained as Ohio's head football coach through the 1946 season.

Schedule

References

Ohio
Ohio Bobcats football seasons
Ohio Bobcats football